Winnie the Pooh's Rumbly Tumbly Adventure is a 2005 action-adventure game developed by French company Phoenix Studio and co-published by Ubisoft and Disney Interactive. Intended towards younger audiences, the game is based on the Disney version of the Winnie the Pooh character. The game was re-released as a PS2 Classic on the PlayStation Store in 2013.

Gameplay
The game has three different modes: Adventure Mode, Junior Mode and Multi-player Mini-Games. Adventure Mode is basically Story Mode. While Christopher Robin and Winnie the Pooh take an adventure in the woods, Pooh starts to feel hungry. Christopher Robin tells Pooh to recall happy memories. Pooh thinks that this is a good idea and he therefore does so. Junior Mode is for even younger children and has no objectives to do, and Multi-player Mini-Games allows 1-4 players to play 3 minigames with 2 more being unlockable via Adventure Mode.

Plot
Winnie the Pooh and Christopher Robin take a walk in the Hundred Acre Wood. Along the way, Pooh complains that he is hungry. Christopher Robin tells Pooh to think of something else. Pooh has no idea as to what to think about, so Christopher Robin tells him to remember his favorite times. Pooh decides to read the birthday scrapbooks of some of his friends, and finally his own which takes him through flashbacks of his birthday adventures where he looks for Piglet and finds him a broom, searches for Tigger, search for two missing Tigger costumes, looks for a new home for Eeyore, and going on a treasure hunt. After reading them all and completing the adventures, Christopher Robin shows up and gives him a picnic with all of his friends.

Reception

The GameCube and PlayStation 2 versions received "mixed" reviews, while the Game Boy Advance version received "generally unfavorable reviews", according to video game review aggregator Metacritic.

References

External links
 

2005 video games
Mobile games
Ubisoft games
GameCube games
RenderWare games
PlayStation 2 games
Game Boy Advance games
PlayStation Network games
Winnie-the-Pooh video games
Video games about bears
Video games about pigs
Video games about rabbits and hares
Video games about kangaroos and wallabies
Video games about children
Video games about birthdays
Works about friendship
Video games set in forests
Video games developed in France
Multiplayer and single-player video games